Biju Govind is an Indian journalist based in Kerala.  Currently he is Chief of Bureau of The Hindu in Kozhikode and coordinating news in Malabar. He has authored reports and articles on numerous issues including political violence and communal riots in north Kerala, and religious issues affecting the common man. Besides, he regularly writes analytical stories and comment pieces on political developments.

Govind first worked for the United News of India (UNI) in New Delhi, reporting on a Tibetan woman seeking the release of her son, who had been arrested by the Chinese police on charges of espionage in 1997. He then joined The Indian Express in Thiruvananthapuram, and thereafter The New Indian Express out of Kochi.

Govind later moved to The Hindu, working from Kozhikode, in June 2001. He now covers politics, organized crime, development issues of roads, infrastructure, and realty.
He has reported the Marad riots that occurred between Hindu and Muslim communities in Kozhikode in 2002 and the massacre of nine fishermen again at the seaside village in 2003. He had also covered the Muthanga agitation of  Wayanad tribes against the government in 2002.

Govind reported the infiltration of Maoists in the tri-junction of Tamil Nadu, Karnataka and Kerala. He has also reported about the Indian Mujahideen in Kerala and Islamist modules that recruited Muslim youths for Islamic State fighters in Syria.

References

 Biju Govind’s Biography | Muck Rack
 13 missing from Kerala, suspected to have joined IS
 Indian Mujahideen eyes Kerala youth

The Hindu journalists
Living people
Place of birth missing (living people)
Journalists from Kerala
1972 births